Tirumangalakottai West is a village in the Orathanadu taluk of Thanjavur district, Tamil Nadu, India.

Demographics 

As per the 2001 census, Tirumangalakottai West had a total population of 2228 with 1081 males and 1147 females. The sex ratio was 1061. The literacy rate was 68.31.

Temple 

Perumal Kovil 
Ayyanar Kovil 
Murugan Kovil 
Pillaiyar Kovil

References 

 

Villages in Thanjavur district